Make UK, formerly the Engineering Employers' Federation, represents manufacturers in the United Kingdom.

Purpose 
Make UK provides businesses with advice, guidance and support in employment law, employee relations, health, safety, climate and environment, information and research and occupational health.

Through offices in London and Brussels, Make UK provides political representation on behalf of UK business in the engineering, manufacturing and technology-based sectors: lobbying government, MPs, regional development agencies, MEPs and European institutions.

History
EEF was formed in 1896 as the Engineering Employers' Federation and merged in 1918 with the National Employers' Federation.
A history of the EEF cited in  states that the original purpose of the EEF was "collective action to protect individual firms and local associations, the preservation of the ‘power to manage’, and the maintenance of industrial peace through established procedure." The EEF functioned as a 'Union' of Employers and negotiated from this stance with Trades Unions, for instance "twice, in 1897-8 and 1922, the Federation organised nationwide lock-outs. Procedural agreements for the avoidance of disputes were made with the unions at the conclusion of each of these lock-outs. These agreements provided for local and national joint conferences on disputed matters".

In November 2003 the EEF rebranded itself from the 'Engineering Employers' Federation' to 'EEF The Manufacturers' Organisation'. In February 2019 EEF rebranded to Make UK

The EEF archive  is curated by Warwick University's Modern Records Centre.

References

External links 
 Make UK website
Catalogue of the EEF archives, held at the Modern Records Centre, University of Warwick
Catalogue of the Engineering Employers' East Midlands Association archives, held at the Modern Records Centre, University of Warwick
Catalogue of the West Midlands Engineering Employers' Association archives, held at the Modern Records Centre, University of Warwick
Catalogue of the Coventry and District Engineering Employers' Association archives, held at the Modern Records Centre, University of Warwick

Business organisations based in the United Kingdom
1896 establishments in the United Kingdom
Engineering education in the United Kingdom
Manufacturing in the United Kingdom
Manufacturing trade associations
Organisations based in the City of Westminster
Organizations established in 1896